Handley may refer to:

Places

In the United Kingdom
Handley, Cheshire, a village
Handley, a hamlet in the parish of Stretton, Derbyshire
Middle Handley, a hamlet in the parish of Unstone, Derbyshire
Nether Handley, a hamlet in the parish of Unstone, Derbyshire
West Handley, a hamlet in the parish of Unstone, Derbyshire
Handley, a village in Dorset now known as Sixpenny Handley

In the United States
Handley, Dallas County, Missouri
Handley (Fort Worth), a former town currently located with the city of Fort Worth, Texas
Handley, West Virginia
John Handley High School, Winchester, Virginia

Other uses
Handley (surname)
Handley Page H.P.42, British four-engine long-range biplane airliners in service from 1931 to 1940

See also
Hanley (disambiguation)